The 1999–2000 Pittsburgh Panthers men's basketball team represented the University of Pittsburgh in the 1999–2000 NCAA Division I men's basketball season. Led by first year head coach Ben Howland, the Panthers finished with a record of 13–15.

References

Pittsburgh Panthers men's basketball seasons
Pittsburgh
Pittsburgh Pan
Pittsburgh Pan